Parliamentary elections are scheduled to be held in Cuba on 26 March 2023 to elect members of the National Assembly of People's Power. They will be the first elections since 1976 in which neither Fidel nor Raúl Castro are involved. Miguel Díaz-Canel succeeded Raúl Castro, brother of Fidel Castro, as the First Secretary of the Communist Party of Cuba on 19 April 2021, marking the end of the Castro era in Cuba.

Background
In the 2018 parliamentary elections, 80% of voters voted for the full list and 20% for only selected candidates.

Electoral system
All Cuban citizens who are at least 18 years of age and have possessed full political rights for at least five years prior to the elections are eligible to contest the elections. 50% of candidates must be nominated by people from the municipality and elected by direct vote in local assemblies. The other 50% of candidates are proposed by nominating assemblies consisting of representatives of workers, youth, women, students, farmers and members of the Committees for the Defense of the Revolution. The final list of candidates, which corresponds to the number of seats to be filled, is drawn up by the National Candidature Commission taking into account criteria such as candidates' merit, patriotism, ethical values and revolutionary history. The electoral system is designed to give the winner of the election a majority. To be declared elected, candidates must obtain more than 50% of the valid votes cast in the constituency in which they are running. If this is not attained, the seat in question remains vacant unless the Council of State decides to hold a second round of voting.

Voters must be Cuban citizens who have reached the age of 16 years who have not been declared mentally disabled by a court or have committed a crime.

References

Parliamentary elections in Cuba
Cuba
One-party elections
Single-candidate elections
2023 in Cuba